Cutler's Park was briefly the headquarters camp of the Church of Jesus Christ of Latter-day Saints (LDS Church) established by 2,500 members as they were making their way westward to the Rocky Mountains. It was apparently created in August 1846 and covered all around what is now the intersection of Mormon Bridge Road and Young Street in Omaha, Nebraska, though it appears to have been completely vacated by December 1846, before even Nebraska Territory came into existence. Historic Florence, Nebraska was built on its site, making use of what had been left when it was abandoned.

Cutler's Park proved to be Nebraska's first and briefest planned community. Although it was made up of only tents and wagons arranged in orderly squares, it had a governing council with various committees, an emergency brigade, and even a town square. A monument has been erected to commemorate this historic site. Cutler's Park was named in honor of Alpheus Cutler, who founded the site. Cutler was an early leader in the  Latter Day Saint movement, who was later known for being one of the master builders of the Nauvoo Temple and for establishing his own branch of Mormonism known as the Church of Jesus Christ (Cutlerite). Cutler's Park was some 3½ miles west-southwest of another short-lived but notable settlement established in 1846,  Winter Quarters, which outlasted Cutler's Park, remaining until 1848.

External links

http://earlylds.com/settlment_culters_park.html
http://www.historicflorence.org/HistoricMarkers/CutlersParkMarker.htm
http://www.historicflorence.org/Mormons/CutlersPark.htm

History of the Church of Jesus Christ of Latter-day Saints
Mormon Trail
1846 establishments in Indian Territory
1846 disestablishments
Defunct organizational subdivisions of the Church of Jesus Christ of Latter-day Saints
Latter Day Saint movement in Nebraska